Vieux Labbé is a rum produced and bottled in Haiti by Berling S.A. in Port-au-Prince.

History
The family business began on March 18, 1862, producing rum directly from sugar cane juice. Dupré Barbancourt, a Frenchman from the cognac-producing region of Charente emigrated to Haiti, and founded his company at the end of 1862. After learning how to make rum in December of that year, he soon began selling it for HTG 1.50 (USD $0.30) per gallon. His grand-daughter Jeanne Barbancourt married a German fragrance specialist, Mr. Berling. He gave his name to the company Berling SA that makes the Rhum Vieux Labbé.

Description
Vieux Labbé is a rum produced and bottled in Haiti by Berling S.A. in Port-au-Prince. The company Berling SA is owned by Herbert Barbancourt Linge. Vieux Labbé is aged in oak barrels in the traditional Haitian-style of Cognac distillation that originated in France.

Products
 Rhum Vieux Labbé 3-Star (aged 3 years)
 Rhum Vieux Labbé 5-Star (aged 7 years)
 Rhum Vieux Labbé Edition Speciale (aged 8 years)
 Rhum Vieux Labbé 10 years

Awards
2007: Winner of the inaugural Drinks International Rum Challenge for rum over 7 years old.
2008: Superior Taste Award by the International Taste and Quality Institute (iTQi)

See also
Rhum Barbancourt
Rhum agricole

References

External links

Haitian alcoholic drinks
Haitian brands
Rums